Aşkın Nur Yengi (born 3 July 1970) is a Turkish singer and actress.

With her debut album Sevgiliye in 1990 she became one of the most successful Turkish singers of the '90s.

Personal life 
Yengi married Haluk Bilginer in 2006 and they have a daughter. The couple divorced in 2012 after six years.

Discography

Albums

Singles 
 "Peşindeyim" (2000)
 "Allah'tan Kork" (with Mehmet Erdem) (2019)
 "Baba" (2020)

Filmography

Theater 
Kadıncıklar (2001)

Documentaries 
Kurtuluş

Series 
Olacak O Kadar Televizyonu, (2001)
Cesur Kuşku
Bayanlar Baylar

Movies 
Ömerçip

TV programs 
Altın Adımlar Yarışması - (TRT)

Awards 
1987 – Kuşadası Golden Pigeon Song Contest
1988 – International Antalya Golden Orange Film Festival
1989 – Çeşme Music Festival

References

1970 births
Living people
Actresses from Istanbul
Singers from Istanbul
Turkish film actresses
Turkish television actresses
Turkish pop singers
21st-century Turkish singers
21st-century Turkish women singers